is a subway station in Takanawa 1-chōme, Minato, Tokyo, Japan, jointly operated by the two Tokyo subway operators, Tokyo Metro and Toei Subway.

Lines 
 Tokyo Metro Namboku Line (N-03)
 Toei Mita Line (I-03)

Namboku Line and Mita Line shares their lines between this station and Meguro station, the two lines' terminal. The trains from Shirokane-takanawa station either run onto the  toward , or run onto the  toward , or be terminated at this station.

Station layout

Tokyo Metro and Toei
The station consists of two island platforms serving four tracks. Mita Line uses the outer two tracks and Namboku Line uses the inner two tracks. Trains going northward uses platforms 1 and 2, ones going southward uses platforms 3 and 4, so that passengers can change their trains smoothly. The ticket gates are on the first basement floor and the platforms are on the third basement floor. The ticket gates are also shared with both Tokyo Metro and Toei. Passengers don't need to go through ticket gates to change their trains.

History  
Shirokane-takanawa Station opened on September 26, 2000.

The station facilities of the Namboku Line were inherited by Tokyo Metro after the privatization of the Teito Rapid Transit Authority (TRTA) in 2004.

On August 25, 2021, an acid attack took place at the station where a 22-year-old businessman sustained burns to his face, while a 34-year-old woman had burns on her legs.

References

External links

Tokyo Metro Shirokane-takanawa Station 
Toei Mita Line Shirokane-takanawa Station 

Railway stations in Japan opened in 2000
Railway stations in Tokyo
Toei Mita Line
Tokyo Metro Namboku Line